Azad Moopen (born 15 April 1953) is an Indian healthcare entrepreneur. He is the developer of many healthcare facilities in Asia-Pacific. He is also the chairman and managing director of Aster DM Healthcare, a healthcare conglomerate in the Middle East and India founded in 1987.

Early life and education 

Azad Moopen was born on 15 April 1953 in the Indian village Kalpakanchery in Malappuram district of Kerala. He was son of Late Mandayapurath Ahmed Unni Moopen, a noble, freedom fighter and social leader. Dr. Azad Moopen is a gold medalist in MBBS and a Post Graduate in General Medicine from Government Medical College, Kozhikode in Kerala. He is also a Diploma holder in Chest Diseases from Delhi University India.

Family 
Dr. Moopen is married to Nazeera Azad and has three daughters namely Alisha Moopen, Ziham Moopen and Zeba Moopen.

Career 
In 1982, Moopen started his career as a Medical Lecturer at Government Medical College, Kozhikode but he took a decision of relocating to Dubai in 1987.

From a single doctor clinic in Dubai in 1987, over 34 years, Aster DM Healthcare has grown into a global healthcare conglomerate of more than 377 facilities spread across eight countries

The company is one of the largest integrated healthcare service providers in GCC and India. Along with providing medical care to millions of people across geographies, Aster DM healthcare now provides direct employment to more than 20,500 people which includes approximately 2,998 doctors and the numbers are still growing.

Healthcare development in India 
Moopen has been involved in the development of healthcare facilities in India. MIMS hospitals directly employ about 3,000 people.

He participated in establishing the 600-bed tertiary care Malabar Institute of Medical Sciences (MIMS) hospital at Kozhikode in Kerala in 2001. This was the first multi-specialty hospital in India to receive National Accreditation Board for Hospitals & Healthcare Providers accreditation in 2007. The second 150-bed MIMS hospital was set up at Kottakkal in Malappuram district in 2009.

MIMS Charitable Trust under his leadership established a rural health centre at the backward Vazhayur Panchayat near Kozhikode in 2008 and adopted 7,000 BPL members for comprehensive free out-patient and in-patient care. The trust is adopting the BPL population in the three wards around MIMS in the Corporation of Kozhikode and also plans to conduct a breast and cervical cancer screening programme.

Other activities 

He was the Gulf Area convener of the Malabar Airport Development Action Committee, which spearheaded the efforts for the establishment of Kozhikode International Airport through a public–private partnership initiative in the 1990s. This is the first airport set up with such private participation in the country. He is the founding chairman of the Association of Kerala Medical Graduates and the Association of Indian Muslims in the UAE. He is also one of the promoters of Credence High School, Dubai, a secondary school he co-founded along with others in 2014.

Moopen is vice chairman of the Social Advancement Foundation of India. He is involved with the charities Aster DM Foundation and Dr. Moopen Family Foundation.

IPO listing 

In February 2018, Aster DM Healthcare announced its initial Public Offer IPO and had fixed a price Rs 180 to Rs 190 for the public offer. Dr. Azad Moopen believes the company will take a decision later to seek listing on other exchanges like London or Dubai.

Awards and recognitions 

 Padma Shri Award by the Government of India (2011)
 Pravasi Bharatiya Samman by the Government of India (2010)
 Arab Health Award for "Outstanding Contribution of an Individual to the Middle East Healthcare Industry" (2010)
 Best Doctor Award by the Government of Kerala (2009)
 Dubai Service Excellence Award (2004) by the Government of Dubai, United Arab Emirates for the Group
 Kerala Ratna Award by Keraleeyam presented by Shri K G Balakrishnan, Hon. Chief Justice of India, in New Delhi (2008) (Section - Reports 2008-2009)
 Aslam Kshema Award by Kshema Foundation for outstanding effort to help economically deprived people (2009)
Lifetime Achievement Award by FICCI Healthcare Excellence Awards (2018)
 Honored with the 'Lifetime Achievement Award' at the 9th Entrepreneur India Awards in 2019
 Received the 'Visionary CEO of the Year Award' in recognition of his contribution at the CEO Middle East Awards by Arabian Business in 2019
 Awarded with a fellowship of the Royal College of Physicians (FRCP), UK in 2019, for his significant contribution to the medical and healthcare profession.
 Honored with the 'Lifetime Achievement Award' at the Gulf Indian Leadership Summit in 2018
 Recognized as one of the '100 Most Inspiring Leaders in the Middle East' by Arabian Business Magazine in 2018
 Listed #6 in the 'Top 100 Indian Business Leaders in UAE' by Forbes in 2017
 Arabian Business Achievement Award from the ITP Publishing Group in 2010

See also
Dr. Moopens Academy

References

Living people
20th-century Indian medical doctors
Recipients of the Padma Shri in social work
Recipients of Pravasi Bharatiya Samman
1953 births
Indian expatriates in the United Arab Emirates
People from Malappuram district
Kerala diaspora
Indian billionaires